Somba may refer to:
Somba, Iran, a village in South Khorasan Province, Iran
Somba people, an ethnic group of northern Benin
Soma Bay, Egypt